Karakuri Circus is a Japanese manga series written and illustrated by Kazuhiro Fujita. It was serialized in Shogakukan's Weekly Shōnen Sunday from July 23, 1997, to June 14, 2006. It spanned 425 chapters, which were collected in 43 tankōbon volumes, with the first volume being released on December 10, 1997, and the last one on August 11, 2006. The manga has been reprinted and collected in multiple editions; "My first wide" edition (collected into 16 volumes, released from November 2008 to February 2010), wide-ban edition (collected into 23 volumes, released from July 2011 to April 2013), bunkoban edition (collected into 22 volumes, released from May 2017 to February 2019), and kanzenban edition (collected into 26 volumes, released from September 2018 to September 2019).


Volume list

References

External links
  
 

Karakuri Circus